Mycalidae is a family of marine demosponges.

Genera
According to the World Register of Marine Species, there are only two genera in this family. Previously there were about 26, but most of these have been reallocated as sub-genera of the remaining two genera, Mycale and Phlyctaenopora:

Genus Mycale Gray, 1867
subgenus Mycale (Aegogropila) Gray, 1867 - About 37 species.
Subgenus Mycale (Anomomycale) Topsent, 1924 - Monotypic. 
Species Mycale (Anomomycale) titubans (Schmidt, 1870)
Subgenus Mycale (Arenochalina) Lendenfeld, 1887 - About 13 species.
Subgenus Mycale (Carmia) Gray, 1867 - About 46 species.
Subgenus Mycale (Grapelia) Gray, 1867 - About 9 species.
Subgenus Mycale (Mycale) Gray, 1867 - About 45 species.
Subgenus Mycale (Naviculina) Gray, 1867 - About 11 species.
Subgenus Mycale (Oxymycale) Hentschel, 1929 - About 9 species.
Subgenus Mycale (Paresperella) Dendy, 1905 - About 18 species.
Subgenus Mycale (Rhaphidotheca) Kent, 1870 - About 4 species.
Subgenus Mycale (Zygomycale) Topsent, 1931 - About 3 species.
Unallocated Mycale: About 33 species.
Genus Phlyctaenopora Topsent, 1904
Subgenus Phlyctaenopora (Barbozia) Dendy, 1922 - 2 species.
Species Phlyctaenopora (Barbozia) bocagei Lévi & Lévi, 1983
Species Phlyctaenopora (Barbozia) primitiva (Dendy, 1922)
Subgenus Phlyctaenopora (Phlyctaenopora) Topsent, 1904 - 2 species.
Species Phlyctaenopora (Phlyctaenopora) bitorquis Topsent, 1904
Species Phlyctaenopora (Phlyctaenopora) halichondrioides van Soest & Stentoft, 1988

References

Poecilosclerida

Demospongiae
Sponge families